Kelvin Yii Lee Wuen (born 31 August 1986), is a Malaysian politician from the Democratic Action Party (DAP), a component party of the Pakatan Harapan (PH) coalition. He has served as the Member of Parliament (MP) for Bandar Kuching since May 2018 and Chair of the Health, Science and Innovation Select Committee since January 2021 and is a member of the Budget Select Committee. He has also served as the Youth Chief or known as the Chief of the Youth Wing namely Democratic Action Party Socialist Youth (DAPSY) since March 2022 and 5th Youth Chief of PH since July 2022. Yii also serves as special assistant to Chong Chieng Jen, Stampin MP.

Education
Between 2006 and 2011, Yii was enrolled at the Volgograd State Medical University in Volgograd, Russia and obtained a Doctor of Medicine (MD) degree. He was also 1st vice president of the university's Malaysian Chinese Students Community committee for the 2009/10 term.

In June 2016, Yii graduated from the University of London with a Bachelor of Laws (Honours) (LL.B. (Hons)). Upon receiving his LL.B., Yii then studied for a Master of Laws (LL.M.) in medical law at Northumbria University.

In September 2020, Yii completed a two-month online certification course in Business, International Relations and the Political Economy conducted by the London School of Economics and Political Science.

Political career
On 24 April 2018, Yii was announced as the candidate of DAP to contest for the Bandar Kuching federal seat as one of the three new faces fielded by the party in the 2018 Malaysian general election.

On 9 May 2018, he went on to win the seat and be elected as the new Bandar Kuching MP by a total of 48,548 votes and a majority of 35,973 votes.

On 4 November 2018, he was elected into the DAP state party committee and appointed as Assistant Secretary for a term from 2018 to 2020 in the 18th Sarawak DAP state convention.

On 4 December 2018, Speaker of the Dewan Rakyat Mohamad Ariff Md Yusof appointed Yii as a member of the newly formed Budget Select Committee.

On 14 January 2021, Yii was appointed as Chair of the Health, Science and Innovation Select Committee by Speaker of the Dewan Rakyat Azhar Azizan Harun.

On 18 December 2021, he contested for the Batu Kawah state seat in the 2021 Sarawak state election. He was however defeated landslide by State Minister of Housing and Local Government of Sarawak Sim Kui Hian by a minority of 5,393 votes.

On 16 January 2022, he was reelected as a member of the Sarawak DAP state committee in the 19th Sarawak DAP state convention for another new term from 2021 to 2023. He was appointed a new position namely Publicity Secretary, taking over from Lanang MP Alice Lau Kiong Yeng who went on to be the deputy chairperson. The assistant secretary position left vacated by him was taken over by Larry Asap.

On 19 March 2022, he was elected as the new Youth Chief of DAP, in other name, the Chief of DAP Socialist Youth (DAPSY), which is the name of the DAP youth wing in the DAPSY national elections by defeating Bandar Utama MLA Jamaliah Jamaluddin and DAPSY national secretary Eric Teh Hoong Keat by a total of 232 votes, taking over from former Member of the Perak State Executive Council (EXCO) and present Member of the Perak State Legislative Assembly (MLA) for Pasir Pinji Lee Chuan How. For the DAPSY deputy chief election, Ketari MLA Young Syefura Othman defeated the Batu Kitang DAP branch chairman Abdul Aziz Isa and Alice Lan Suet Ling by total of 212 votes and a majority of 43 votes to be his deputy.

Personal life
On 17 March 2020, Yii tested positive for COVID-19 and was quarantined at Sarawak General Hospital. He was suspected of having been infected with the virus after meeting Sarikei MP Wong Ling Biu who was also tested positive for the virus. He was announced to have recovered on 23 March 2020.

Election results

See also
 Budget Select Committee (Malaysia)
 Bandar Kuching (federal constituency)

References

1986 births
Living people
People from Sarawak
People from Kuching
Malaysian politicians of Chinese descent
Sarawak politicians
Democratic Action Party (Malaysia) politicians
Members of the Dewan Rakyat
Alumni of the London School of Economics
Alumni of the University of London
21st-century Malaysian politicians